FGI may refer to:

 Fagali'i Airport, in Samoa
 Faith and Globalisation Initiative, an international group of universities
 Fashion Group International, a professional organization in the fashion industry
 FASA Games, Inc.
 Functional group interconversion
Functional Genetics, Inc, e.g. FGI-103, FGI-104, FGI-106.